Lasiosticha canilinea is a species of moth of the  family Pyralidae. It is found in Australia.

References

Moths described in 1879
Phycitini
Moths of Australia